Vakuf may refer to:

 Spelling for Waqf in southeastern Europe

Bosnia and Herzegovina
 Gornji Vakuf
 Donji Vakuf
 Kulen Vakuf
 Vakuf (Gradiška)

North Macedonia
 Vakuf, Kratovo Municipality